Lohr Industrie is a French manufacturer. With a track record in the manufacture of high-tech car transporter systems (primarily for road haulage), this manufacturer has developed the Translohr tram cars and Modalohr road/rail transfer system, and, in cooperation with GIAT Industries, the Caesar 155 mm Self-Propelled Artillery System. Lohr Industrie and Translohr were mistranslated as Rollindustry and Transroll respectively in China due to the voicing confusion. Lohr is a commune (village) in France, but is also the surname of the company's founder.

See also
 Car carrier trailer
 Modalohr road trailer carriers

References

External links
 Groupe Lohr

Manufacturing companies of France